Classic Cola may refer to:
Classic Cola (Sainsbury's)
Olvi Cola, formerly Classic Cola
Coca Cola Classic